Gun-Hand Garrison is a 1927 American silent Western film directed by Edward Gordon and starring Kermit Maynard, Ruby Blaine and Jack Anthony.

Cast
 Kermit Maynard
 Ruby Blaine
 Jack Anthony
 Charles O'Malley
 Charles Schaeffer
 Edward Heim
 A.E. Witting
 Paul Malvern

References

External links
 

1927 films
1927 Western (genre) films
American black-and-white films
Films directed by Edward Gordon
Rayart Pictures films
Silent American Western (genre) films
1920s English-language films
1920s American films